The Shape of Dolls is an EP by New Zealand band Able Tasmans, released on Flying Nun Records in 1993.

Track listing
"Dog-Whelk" – 3:43
"The Big Bang Theory" – 3:59
"Coming Up For Air" – 3:39
"Mayfly May" – 4:19
"The Shape of Dolls" – 3:47

References

Able Tasmans albums
1993 EPs
Flying Nun Records EPs